Sodré or Sodre may refer to:

Constante Gomes Sodré, the third president (governor) of the Brazilian state of Espírito Santo
Jéssica Sodré (born 1985), Brazilian television actress
Joanídia Sodré (1903–1975), Brazilian music educator, pianist, conductor and composer
Mimi Sodré, (1892–1982), Brazilian scout and football striker
Pierre Veiga Sodre (born 1987), Brazilian Midfielder
Raimundo Sodré (born 1948), Brazilian musician
Vasco Gil Sodré (c.1450–c.1500), Portuguese navigator 
Vicente Sodré (1465–1503), Portuguese knight of Order of Christ and naval captain 
SODRE, Servicio Oficial de Difusión, Radiotelevisión y Espectáculos, Uruguay's national broadcaster

See also
Cais do Sodré, railway and metro stations in Lisbon, Portugal
Cais-do-Sodré té Salamansa, the first short story book published by Orlanda Amarílis
Estádio Leônidas Sodré de Castro or Estádio da Curuzú, football stadium in São Braz neighborhood, Belém, Pará, Brazil
Sodere
Soderi
Szczodre
Sedreh
Seudre
Szedres

Portuguese-language surnames